Nonkosi Queenie Mvana is a South African politician. She is an African National Congress member of the Parliament of South Africa.

References 

Living people
Members of the National Assembly of South Africa
Women members of the National Assembly of South Africa
Year of birth missing (living people)